The following is the list of squads that took place in the women's field hockey tournament at the 1988 Summer Olympics.

Argentina
The following players represented Argentina:

 Laura Mulhall
 María Colombo
 Marisa López
 María Alejandra Tucat
 Victoria Carbó
 Marcela Richezza
 Gabriela Liz
 Gabriela Sánchez
 Moira Brinnand
 Marcela Hussey
 Alejandra Palma
 María Bengochea
 Alina Vergara
 María Gabriela Pazos
 Andrea Fioroni

Australia
The following players represented Australia:

 Kathleen Partridge
 Elspeth Clement
 Liane Tooth
 Loretta Dorman
 Lorraine Hillas
 Michelle Hager
 Sandra Pisani
 Debbie Bowman-Sullivan
 Lee Capes
 Kim Small
 Sally Carbon
 Jackie Pereira
 Tracey Belbin
 Rechelle Hawkes
 Sharon Buchanan-Patmore
 Maree Fish

Canada
The following players represented Canada:

 Sharon Bayes
 Wendy Baker
 Deb Covey
 Lisa Lyn
 Laura Branchaud
 Sandra Levy
 Kathryn Johnson
 Shona Schleppe
 Mary Conn
 Liz Czenczek
 Sheila Forshaw
 Nancy Charlton
 Sara Ballantyne
 Sharon Creelman

Great Britain
The following players represented Great Britain:

 Jill Atkins
 Wendy Banks
 Gillian Brown
 Karen Brown
 Mary Nevill
 Julie Cook
 Vicky Dixon
 Wendy Fraser
 Barbara Hambly
 Caroline Jordan
 Violet McBride
 Moira MacLeod
 Caroline Brewer
 Jane Sixsmith
 Kate Parker
 Alison Ramsay

Netherlands
The following players represented the Netherlands:

 Det de Beus
 Yvonne Buter
 Willemien Aardenburg
 Laurien Willemse
 Marjolein Bolhuis-Eijsvogel
 Lisanne Lejeune
 Carina Benninga
 Annemieke Fokke
 Ingrid Wolff
 Marieke van Doorn
 Sophie von Weiler
 Aletta van Manen
 Noor Holsboer
 Helen van der Ben
 Martine Ohr
 Anneloes Nieuwenhuizen

South Korea
The following players represented South Korea:

 Kim Mi-sun
 Han Ok-kyung
 Chang Eun-jung
 Han Gum-shil
 Choi Choon-ok
 Kim Sun-deok
 Chung Sang-hyun
 Jin Won-sim
 Hwang Keum-sook
 Cho Ki-hyang
 Seo Kwang-mi
 Park Soon-ja
 Kim Yeong-suk
 Seo Hyo-sun
 Lim Kye-sook
 Chung Eun-kyung

United States
The following players represented the United States:

 Patty Shea
 Yogi Hightower
 Mary Koboldt
 Marcia Pankratz
 Cheryl Van Kuren
 Diane Bracalente
 Beth Beglin
 Marcy Place-von Schottenstein
 Sandy Vander-Heyden
 Tracey Fuchs
 Sheryl Johnson
 Sandra Costigan
 Christy Morgan
 Barbara Marois
 Megan Donnelly
 Donna Lee

West Germany
The following players represented West Germany:

 Susi Schmid
 Carola Hoffmann
 Heike Gehrmann
 Dagmar Breiken-Bremer
 Gaby Uhlenbruck
 Viola Grahl
 Bettina Blumenberg
 Gaby Appel
 Martina Koch-Hallmen
 Christine Ferneck
 Silke Wehrmeister
 Caren Jungjohann
 Eva Hegener
 Susie Wollschläger
 Gabriela Schöwe

References

1988